Hasse Holmqvist (born 18 June 1945) is a former speedway rider from Sweden.

Speedway career 
Holmqvist was a leading speedway rider in the late 1960s. He reached the final of the Speedway World Championship in the 1968 Individual Speedway World Championship and the 1969 Individual Speedway World Championship.

He won the silver medal in 1975 and bronze medal in 1968 at the Swedish Championship.

He rode in the top tier of British Speedway from 1967 until 1975, riding for Wolverhampton Wolves and Oxford Cheetahs.

World final appearances

Individual World Championship
 1968 –  Gothenburg, Ullevi – 8th – 9pts
 1969 –  London, Wembley Stadium – 5th – 10pts

World Pairs Championship
 1972 -  Borås (with Bernt Persson) - 3rd - 22pts (9)

Individual Ice Speedway World Championship
1971  Inzell, 12th – 11pts

References 

1945 births
Living people
Swedish speedway riders
Oxford Cheetahs riders
Wolverhampton Wolves riders
People from Avesta Municipality
Sportspeople from Dalarna County